Mahoney Lake is a meromictic saline lake located near Okanagan Falls in British Columbia, Canada. It was established as an ecological reserve to preserve a southern interior saline lake, possessing unique limnological features in 1972. It has a unique layering, where the very bottom of the lake is very salt rich and contains hydrogen sulphide (H2S), which facilitates the growth of the purple sulphur bacteria in the layer above it, where the bacteria has just enough light to grow. The upper layer of the lake consists of a mixing layer of fresh water. Mahoney Lake is alkaline because it features no inflow or outflow of water. The lake also contains very low levels of oxygen and an approximate pH of 7.5-9.0. The surface area of the lake is 18ha and the surface area of the land is 21ha, with combined total of 21 ha.

Images

External links
Mahoney Lake ER130 Accessed September 12, 2013.
Mahoney Lake Ecological Reserve Accessed September 12, 2013.

References

Tourist attractions in the Okanagan
Mahoney
Mahoney
Similkameen Division Yale Land District
Lakes of the Okanagan
Articles containing video clips